The Anderson–Price Memorial Library Building (also known as the Ormond Beach Woman's Club) is a historic library in Ormond Beach, Florida, United States. It is located at 42 North Beach Street, and was named for the City of Ormond Beach's co-founders John Anderson and Joseph D. Price. It was added to the National Register of Historic Places in 1984.

Now run by the Ormond Beach Historical Trust, this building is the site of many events throughout the year.

See also
List of Registered Historic Woman's Clubhouses in Florida

References

External links
 Volusia County listings at National Register of Historic Places
 Anderson-Price Memorial Building (Ormond History)
 Florida's Office of Cultural and Historical Programs
 Volusia County listings
 Ormond Beach Woman's Club
 Great Floridians of Ormond Beach

Libraries in Florida
National Register of Historic Places in Volusia County, Florida
1915 establishments in Florida
Libraries established in 1915